The 1989 Stella Artois Championships was a men's tennis tournament played on grass courts at the Queen's Club in London, United Kingdom that was part of the 1989 Nabisco Grand Prix circuit. It was the 87th edition of the tournament and ran from 12 June until 19 June 1989. First-seeded Ivan Lendl won the singles title.

Finals

Singles

 Ivan Lendl defeated  Christo van Rensburg 4–6, 6–3, 6–4
 It was Lendl's 6th title of the year and the 85th of his career.

Doubles

 Darren Cahill /  Mark Kratzmann defeated  Tim Pawsat /  Laurie Warder 7–6, 6–3
 It was Cahill's 1st title of the year and the 8th of his career. It was Kratzmann's 1st title of the year and the 6th of his career.

References

External links
 Official website
 ATP tournament profile

 
Stella Artois Championships
Queen's Club Championships
Stella Artois Championships
Stella Artois Championships
Stella Artois Championships